Bethlehem is a city in the eastern Free State province of South Africa that is situated on the Liebenbergs river (also called Liebenbergs Vlei) along a fertile valley just north of the Rooiberg Mountains on the N5 road. It is the fastest growing city in the Free state province, with its target of being the third largest city after Bloemfontein and Welkom.

The city is strategically situated in the heart of the picturesque north-eastern Free State and originally developed as a service centre. Bethlehem is the seat of the Dihlabeng Local Municipality (this municipality is situated within the boundaries of the Thabo Mofutsanyana District Municipality in the Eastern Free State).

The township associated with Bethlehem is called Bohlokong, named after the hloko/bohloko grass Diheteropogon filifolius.

History

3 Village founders - Today we look at the founders of Bethlehem, in alphabetical order, Malan, Muller and Naude.  The foundation of church and town was practically simultaneous.  In the Museum are the history and artifacts of the founders, including beautiful large framed photographs of each:

Daniel Jacobus Johannes Malan (1821-1892) Johannes Christoffel Muller (1822-1900) Francois Paulus Naude (1800 - 1881)

Their families were all Voortrekkers, experienced the ups and downs of Natal, but they came to make their home and settle in the Bethlehem region.  This triumvirate of J.C.  Pretorius bought the farm Pretoriuskloof and founded a church/town on it.  After approval from the Free State Government, plots were measured in 1864 and 44 were immediately sold.

The founders were farmers and their farms are still in family ownership.  Malan farmed at the famous Malanspos, on the road between Bethlehem and Lindley.  A house and outbuildings were built and he and his wife were buried on the farm Sterkfontein.  Their third son ace the famous Senator D.J.J.  Malan.

Muller's farm, Mullersrust, lies on the Blijdschap/Brighton/Kleingraansentrumpad, next to the Liebenbergsvlei River.  Here was his homestead and in the river he built a mill which was destroyed by the British in the Anglo-Boer War.  He was buried in the family cemetery on the farm.

Naude's farm, Middelvlei, lies along the Bethlehem/Clarenspad, next to the Ash River.  (An axle from a wagon, English - axle, not Ash as it stands on road signs today. An axle from a wagon from the Retieftrek broke in the river.) His first house, built of sod, was well preserved by posterity and  still to be seen near the later homestead.  The family graves can also be seen near the homestead

Society and culture

Museums, provincial heritage sites and memorials

A number of heritage sites are located in Bethlehem:
 14 President Burgers Street 
 A B Baartman Wagon House 
 Loch Athlone Dam Wall 
 Main Building of the Bethlehem Technical College 
 Nederduitse Gereformeerde Mother Church 
 Old Magistrates Court 
 Old Nederduitse Gereformeerde Mission Church parsonage 
 Old Nederduitse Gereformeerde Mission Church 
 St Andrews Presbyterian Church 
 St Augustine Anglican Church 
 Strapps Shop 
 The Seminary
 Town Hall
 Wooden Spoon Restaurant

Schools
Villiers Combined High School
Tiisetsang High School
Ntsu Secondary School
Thabo-Thokoza Secondary School
L.K Ntlabathi Secondary School
Jordania Primary School
Truida Kestell Primary School
Graanveld Primary School
Bethlehem Comprehensive School
Bodikela intermediate School
Bethlehem Voortrekker High School
Bohlokong Primary School
Nthute Primary School
Motshepuwa Primary School
Rehopotswe Primary School
New Horizon College
Impumelelo Primary School
Impucuko Primary School
Khanyeng Intermediate School
Witteberg High School

Climate

Shopping

Bethlehem has many shopping centres like any other town in the Free State. Bethlehem is the main center of the eastern Free State where people from other towns do their shopping, the main shopping malls are:
Bethlehem mall
Dihlabeng mall
 Maluti square.
Others are:
Village square
Sechaba Mall (Previously Metropolitan life Centre prior to November 2018)
Shoprite Centre.
With the shopping in this town also characterized by typical high street shopping with majority of shops situated along the Muller, Cambridge, Louw, Church, High and other surrounding streets.

Sport
Premier Soccer League and National First Division clubs Free State Stars and Super Eagles F.C are based in Bethlehem and plays its home games at Goble Park. Bethlehem is also the birthplace of notable rugby union players including Jannie and Bismarck du Plessis and Frans Steyn. One of the greatest rugby players in history, Tom van Vollenhoven who played rugby union for South Africa and rugby league for St Helens in England was born in Bethlehem. 2019 Japan Rugby World Cup winning team player of Springboks, Bongi Mbonambi was born in Bohlokong.

Economy

Bethlehem is a retail, medical, and educational hub for the Eastern Free State. It has three private hospitals and four star Frontier hotel, Casino and Entertainment Centre located near the beautiful Dihlabeng Mall and Bethlehem Aerodrome.

Industry

Bethlehem hosts several industries including Coca-Cola, South African Breweries and Nestlé, as well as petroleum and engineering companies.

Health

 Dihlabeng Regional Hospital (public)
 Phekolong Hospital (Public)
 Hoogland Medi-Clinic (Private)
 Bethlehem Medical Centre (Semi-Private)
 Nurture Corona Hospital (Semi-private)
 Bethlehem Diere Hospital (Private)
 Du Pisani Biokineticists (Private)
 Several government clinics also in the townships of Bohlokong, Thorisong, Vuka, Phumlamqasha, Old Location, Giyani and Bakenpark.

Transportation

Road
Bethlehem is located on the N5 road to the provincial capital Bloemfontein via Senekal and Winburg to the N1. Other regional roads in the town are R76 road to Kroonstad (north), the R26 road to Reitz and Fouriesburg (north east and south) respectively.

Rail
Bethlehem is located on the main railway line between Bloemfontein and Durban. This railway line transports passengers and freight.

Air
Bethlehem is served by a small airport (Bethlehem Airport) with chartered daily flights to Bloemfontein and Johannesburg.

Coats of arms

Municipal (1)
By 1931, the municipal council had assumed a coat of arms. The arms were registered with the Orange Free State Provincial Administration in October 1958.

The arms were: Party per chevron Azure and Gules, a chevron Or,  in chief between two springboks couped at the neck respecting each other, proper, a mullet of the third, and in base three maize cobs, the outer ones pilewise, all proper.  In layman's terms, the shield depicted a golden chevron between a gold star and two springboks' head on a blue background, and three maize cobs on a red background.

Municipal (2)
A new coat of arms was designed in the 1980s.  It was registered at the Bureau of Heraldry in June 1989.

The arms were: Per chevron, Azure and Gules, a chevron Or between in chief a mullet and in base two bars wavy, Argent (i.e. a golden chevron between a silver star on a blue background and two wavy silver stripes on a red background).

The crest was three golden ears of wheat with blue stalks and leaves, tied together with a red band; the motto was Conjuncti prosperamus.

Notable people
 

Faan Fourie (born 1982), cricketer

References

External links

Bethlehem Information
Dihlabeng Local Municipality

Populated places in the Dihlabeng Local Municipality
Bethlehem, South Africa
Populated places established in 1859
1859 establishments in the Orange Free State